The 1958–59 New York Knicks season was the 13th season for the team in the National Basketball Association (NBA). In the regular season, the Knicks finished in second place in the Eastern Division with a 40–32 win–loss record, qualifying for the NBA Playoffs for the first time since the 1955–56 season. New York lost in the first round to the Syracuse Nationals, two games to none.

NBA Draft

Note: This is not an extensive list; it only covers the first and second rounds, and any other players picked by the franchise that played at least one game in the league.

Regular season

Season standings

x – clinched playoff spot

Record vs. opponents

Game log

Playoffs

|- align="center" bgcolor="#ffcccc"
| 1
| March 13
| Syracuse
| L 123–129
| Richie Guerin (24)
| Madison Square Garden III
| 0–1
|- align="center" bgcolor="#ffcccc"
| 2
| March 15
| @ Syracuse
| L 115–131
| Willie Naulls (26)
| Onondaga War Memorial
| 0–2
|-

Awards and records
Richie Guerin, All-NBA Second Team

References

New York Knicks seasons
New York
New York Knicks
New York Knicks
1950s in Manhattan
Madison Square Garden